Requin was an ironclad barbette ship built for the French Navy in the late 1870s and early 1880s. She was last member of the four-ship . They were built as part of a fleet plan started in 1872, which by the late 1870s had been directed against a strengthening Italian fleet. The ships were intended for coastal operations, and as such had a shallow draft and a low freeboard, which greatly hampered their seakeeping and thus reduced their ability to be usefully employed outside of coastal operations after entering service. Armament consisted of a pair of  guns in individual barbettes, the largest-caliber gun ever mounted on a French capital ship. Requin was laid down in 1878 and was completed in 1887.

Unlike her sister ships that served in the Mediterranean Fleet, Requin spent her early career in the Northern Squadron in the English Channel. In 1891, the unit was sent to visit Britain and Russia. She was withdrawn from service in 1896 to be modernized with new armament, propulsion system, and armor. Work was completed in 1901 and the next year she returned to service as a guard ship based in Cherbourg. She was the only member of the class to see action during World War I, during which she was stationed in the Suez Canal to defend the waterway against attacks from the Ottoman Empire. She helped to repel a major attack in February 1915, and supported Allied operations along the coast of Ottoman Palestine in 1917. She was briefly used as a training ship after the war, before being broken up in 1921.

Design

The Terrible class of barbette ships was designed in the late 1870s as part of a naval construction program that began under the post-Franco-Prussian War fleet plan of 1872. In addition, the oldest generation of French ironclads, built in the early-to-mid 1860s, were in poor condition and necessitated replacement. The Terrible class was intended to replace old monitors that had been built for coastal defense. The Terribles were based on the s, but were reduced in size to allow them to operate in shallower waters.

After entering service, the Terrible-class ships were found to have very poor seakeeping as a result of their shallow draft and insufficient freeboard, even in the relatively sheltered waters of the Mediterranean Sea. The Navy had little use for the ships, and through the 1880s and 1890s, a series of French naval ministers sought to find a role for the vessels, along with another ten coastal-defense type ironclads built during that period. The ships frequently alternated between the Mediterranean Squadron and the Northern Squadron, the latter stationed in the English Channel, but neither location suited their poor handling.

Characteristics

The vessel displaced  and had a relatively low freeboard. Her superstructure was minimal and consisted of a small conning tower. She was fitted with a pair of tripod masts equipped with spotting tops for her main battery guns. The ship's crew consisted of 373 officers and enlisted men.

Her propulsion machinery consisted of two compound steam engines that drove a pair of screw propellers. Steam was provided by twelve coal-burning fire-tube boilers that were vented through a pair of funnels that were placed side by side, just aft of the conning tower.

Her main armament consisted of two  22-caliber M1875 guns, one forward and one aft, mounted on the centerline in barbettes. They were the largest-bore guns ever carried by a French capital ship. These were supported by a secondary battery of four  26.2-cal. M1881 guns carried in individual pivot mounts with gun shields. For defense against torpedo boats, she carried two  guns, two  M1885 quick-firing guns, one 47 mm Hotchkiss revolver cannon, and ten  revolver cannon, all in individual mounts. Her armament was rounded out with four  torpedo tubes in the hull above the waterline, two tubes per side.

At even normal loading, the belt was nearly submerged entirely, reducing its effectiveness significantly. They were fitted with  hoods to protect the gun crews from shell fragments.

Modifications
Requin was extensively modernized between 1898 and 1892, having her armament and propulsion system completely replaced. Her old 420 mm guns were replaced with a pair of  Modèle 1893/1896 guns; these were 40-caliber M1893.96 guns that were mounted in fully enclosed, balanced turrets. Her secondary battery was replaced with quick-firing conversions of 100 mm guns, with an additional pair being installed. The light battery was also revised to ten 47 mm guns, and she carried four 37 mm autocannon for use aboard her boats. All four of her torpedo tubes were also removed. Her propulsion system was replaced with a pair of triple-expansion steam engines and twelve Niclausse boilers, which were the water-tube type. Her new propulsion system produced . As a result of these changes, her crew was reduced to 332 officers and men.

Service history

The keel for Requin, the last member of the class to be built, was laid down on 15 November 1878 at the Forges et Chantiers de la Gironde shipyard in Lormont. She was launched on 13 June 1885, and installation of her propulsion machinery began on 15 December to 25 November 1886. The ship was then briefly placed in limited commission to be moved to the Arsenal de Rochefort on 18 December, still incomplete, before continuing on to Brest on the 23rd. There, she was decommissioned on 7 January 1887 and her guns and armor plate were installed. She was commissioned to begin sea trials on 1 December 1888, and her official acceptance trials were carried out between March and May 1889. She was pronounced complete in June, and on 9 July, she was placed in the 2nd category of reserve. 

Requin was commissioned for her first period of active service on 1 March 1890 and was assigned to the Northern Squadron. During the fleet maneuvers later that year, Requin served in the 2nd Division of the 1st Squadron of the Mediterranean Fleet. The ships concentrated off Oran, French Algeria on 22 June and then proceeded to Brest, arriving there on 2 July for combined operations with the ships of the Northern Squadron. The exercises began four days later and concluded on 25 July, after which Requin and the rest of the Mediterranean Fleet returned to Toulon. Requin then returned to the Northern Squadron, where she remained for the next five years. 

In 1891, a French squadron that included Requin and the ironclads Marengo, and Furieux, under the command of Admiral Alfred Gervais was sent to visit Kronstadt, Russia. The voyage, which began on 19 June, was to mark the signing of the Franco-Russian Alliance, which was to occur on 27 August. On the way, the ships visited a number of foreign ports, including Bergen and Larvik, Norway, Copenhagen, Denmark, and Stockholm, Sweden, before arriving in Kronstadt on 23 July. On the voyage back, which began on 4 August, the ships stopped in Finland and Norway before calling in Portsmouth, where Queen Victoria reviewed the ships. They reached Cherbourg on 27 August. During a voyage from Saint-Malo to Brest in 1892, Requin took on significant amounts of water, demonstrating the poor seakeeping of her class; an estimated  of water flooded her forward barbette, and her battery deck was thoroughly washed out. That year, she served as the flagship of the Northern Squadron, which at that time also included Furieux on active duty, with another three ironclads in reserve. She remained in the unit the following year, which was kept in commission for four months of the year. By that time, the unit consisted of Requin, Suffren, Furieux, and the ironclad . 

Requin was relieved by the coastal defense ship  on 39 July 1895, and she was reduced to the 2nd category of reserve at Cherbourg on 8 August, where she was to undergo repairs. The decision was then made to embark on a major reconstruction of the ship, and she was decommissioned on 22 October 1897 for work to begin. Her armament was revised with new main and secondary guns and all of her torpedo tubes were removed. She also received new boilers and engines during the reconstruction. Requin was recommissioned for sea trials on 19 October 1901, decommissioned at some point thereafter, and recommissioned for service on 22 April 1902. She briefly went to Toulon on 18 May, before resuming her assignment to the Northern Squadron later that year, where she was based in Cherbourg with the gunboat  as harbor guard ships. She remained in reserve status there for the next several years. 

On 2 October 1909, Requin was transferred back to Toulon and reclassified as a training ship, where she replaced the protected cruiser  as a support vessel for the naval gunnery school aboard the old transport ship . She served in this capacity for the next four years, before she was in turn replaced by the pre-dreadnought  in 1913. Requin was thereafter placed in special reserve at Bizerte in French Tunisia on 15 October. In January 1914, she was re-designated as a coastal defense ship and work began to restore her to active service.

World War I

On 8 October 1914, shortly after the start of World War I, Requin was mobilized at Bizerte, with the mission of guarding the Suez Canal. She was stationed in Ismailia in December 1914 to help guard the canal from Ottoman attacks. In January 1915, some of the French and British cruisers in the canal zone were sent to patrol the southern Anatolian coast between Mersin and Smyrna, and Requin was moved further north to support them if necessary. Early that month, she was sent to join the patrol itself, but in mid-January, additional cruisers arrived to relieve Requin, which was sent back to the canal to resume guard duties. A berth was dredged in Lake Timsah in the Nile Delta for Requin, where she supported the ground forces defending the northern end of the canal. 

Toward the end of the month, an Ottoman force approached the canal, prompting the French to send the protected cruiser  to join Requin in Lake Timsah. The attack came in stages in early February, and on the 3rd, Requin was heavily engaged in helping to repel the assault. She came under fire from Ottoman field artillery batteries, but she neutralized them with her forward 274 mm gun before they could score any hits. The Ottoman attack quickly broke down in the face of the heavy Anglo-French resistance. A small Ottoman force of around 400 men was detected reconnoitering Allied positions in late March, which prompted Requin to prepare for another attack, though no other Ottoman forces were in the area and the reconnaissance party was dispersed. 

In 1917, Requin was employed offensively, bombarding Ottoman positions along the coast of Ottoman Palestine to support Allied operations. During the Third Battle of Gaza in November, Requin again provided fire support to Allied forces. Aircraft from the British seaplane tender  assisted the French gunners during a bombardment of Wadi el Hesi on 1 November. Ottoman counter-battery fire damaged Requin, and she was later sent to Port Said for repairs that lasted into March 1918. She spent much of the rest of the conflict guarding the canal. Following the end of the war in November, she left Port Said on 17 December and returned to Toulon. Requin was thereafter employed as a gunnery training ship until July 1919, She was decommissioned on 1 August, though demobilization work lasted until 20 August. The ship was then stricken from the naval register on 21 June 1920, before being sold on 2 May 1921 to the ship breaking firm .

Notes

References
 
 
 
 
 
 
 
 
 
 
 
 
 
 
 
 

Terrible-class ironclads
1885 ships